Age of Love may refer to:
 The Age of Love (1954 film), an Argentine musical comedy films
 The Age of Love (2014 film), a 2014 documentary film about seniors looking for love
 Age of Love (TV series), a 2007 reality television show on NBC
 Age of Love (album), a 1997 studio album by Scooter
 "The Age of Love" (Age of Love song), 1990
 "The Age of Love" (Scooter song), 1997

See also
Age of consent, the minimum age at which a person is considered to be legally competent to consent to sexual acts